Lord Spencer may refer to:

 Earl Spencer (peerage), an English title of nobility
 Lord Charles Spencer (1740–1820)
 Lord Henry Spencer (1770–1795)
 Michael Spencer, Baron Spencer of Alresford (born 1955)

See also
 Hugh Despenser (justiciar) (1223–1265), Baron le Despencer
 Hugh le Despencer, Baron le Despencer (1338) (1308–1349)